John Avoli is an American politician. A Republican, he is a member of the Virginia House of Delegates, representing the 20th district.

A longtime resident of Staunton, Virginia, Avoli has held multiple positions in the public sector, including serving 16 years on the Staunton City Council, 14 of which as the city's mayor.

Avoli ran in the 2019 Virginia House of Delegates election for the 20th district to succeed retiring delegate Richard Bell. He defeated Democratic candidate Jennifer Lewis with 58.48% of the vote.

In December 2021, Avoli introduced a bill to the House of Delegates that would restrict transgender students' access to public school restrooms and other facilities.

References

Living people
21st-century American politicians
Politicians from Staunton, Virginia
1951 births
Republican Party members of the Virginia House of Delegates